Abdullah Al-Mogren (born 26 November 1996) is a Saudi Arabian professional footballer who plays as a midfielder for Pro League side Al-Ahli.

Career
Al-Mogren started his career at Al-Washm in Saudi Third Division and was part of the squad that achieved promotion from the Saudi Third Division to the Saudi Second Division in the 2014–15 season. He also helped Al-Washm achieve promotion from the Saudi Second Division to the Prince Mohammad bin Salman League in the 2017–18 season. On 19 July 2018, Al-Mogren left Al-Washm and joined Pro league side Al-Raed. He renewed his contract with Al-Raed on July 14, 2019. On 30 January 2022, Al-Mogren joined Al-Ahli on a four-year contract.

References

External links 
 

1996 births
Living people
People from Riyadh Province
Saudi Arabian footballers
Al-Washm Club players
Al-Raed FC players
Al-Ahli Saudi FC players
Saudi Professional League players
Saudi First Division League players
Saudi Second Division players
Saudi Fourth Division players
Association football midfielders